Doctor Copernicus is a novel by John Banville, first published in 1976. "A richly textured tale" about Nicolaus Copernicus, it won that year's James Tait Black Memorial Prize.

Doctor Copernicus contains four sections. The first two focus on the subject's life until about the age of 36. In the third, Copernicus's aide Rheticus narrates how he convinced Copernicus to publish De revolutionibus orbium coelestium. The fourth focuses on the great scientist's death.

Thirty years after it first appeared, Brian McIlroy praised Doctor Copernicus for its "great intellectual ambition." Linda Hutcheon, in A Poetics of Postmodernism, wrote that it is a "historiographic metafiction."

References

1976 novels
Cultural depictions of Nicolaus Copernicus
Historical novels
Novels by John Banville
Novels set in the 16th century
Secker & Warburg books